The Syro-Malabar Catholic Eparchy of Faridabad is a diocese of the Syro-Malabar Catholic Church in Faridabad, a city in Haryana, India. Erected on 6 March 2012 by Pope Benedict XVI it serves around 150,000 Syro-Malabar Catholics in the area of Delhi. Its first and current eparch is Kuriakose Bharanikulangara, with the personal title of archbishop. The eparch resides in Faridabad, where the Kristuraja Cathedral (Christ the King Cathedral) is located.

The eparchy has a size of 950,000 km², spreads over several jurisdictions of Latin rite Catholic dioceses and covers the National Capital Territory of Delhi, the States of Haryana, Punjab, Himachal Pradesh, Jammu-Kashmir as well as the Districts of Gautambuddhanagar and Ghaziabad (part of the State of Uttar Pradesh).

Past and present ordinaries

Causes for canonisation
 Servant of God Sr. Fidelis Thaliath, S.D.

References

External links 

 
Eparchy of Faridabad on Catholic Hierarchy
Kristuraja Cathedral

2012 establishments in Delhi
Christian organizations established in 2012
Eastern Catholic dioceses in India
Roman Catholic dioceses and prelatures established in the 21st century
Syro-Malabar Catholic dioceses